Midori Kudoh (born April 10, 1967, in Hokkaido, Japan; also known as Minori Kudoh, Minori Kudō) is a Japanese curler, a  and a two-time Japan women's champion curler (1989, 1992).

She played for Japan at the 1992 Winter Olympics, where curling was a demonstration sport. The Japanese team finished in eighth place.

Teams

References

External links

Living people
1967 births
Sportspeople from Hokkaido
Japanese female curlers
Pacific-Asian curling champions
Japanese curling champions
Curlers at the 1992 Winter Olympics
Olympic curlers of Japan
20th-century Japanese women
21st-century Japanese women